John Davis Chandler (January 28, 1935 – February 16, 2010) was an American actor.

Life
Chandler was born in Hinton, West Virginia. He died at age 75 in Toluca Lake, California from cancer.

Career
In two films in 1961, he portrayed the gangster Vincent Coll in Mad Dog Coll as well as a kind of mad-dog teen killer in The Young Savages. He appeared in several of Sam Peckinpah's Western films as well as appeared on television between the 1960s and 1990s in The Rifleman, Route 66, Straightaway, The Virginian, Adam-12,  Gunsmoke, Walker, Texas Ranger, Quincy, M.E., Columbo, Murder She Wrote,  and Star Trek: Deep Space Nine. In 1962, Chandler appeared as an escaped convict named Dog on The Virginian in the episode titled "The Brazen Bell."

Selected filmography

 1961 Mad Dog Coll as Vincent "Mad Dog" Coll 
 1961 The Young Savages as Arthur Reardon
 1962 Ride the High Country as Jimmy Hammond
 1965 Those Calloways as Ollie Gibbons
 1965 Major Dundee as Jimmy Lee Benteen
 1965 Once a Thief as James Arthur Sargatanas, Walter's Henchman
 1967 Return of the Gunfighter as "Sundance"
 1968 The Hooked Generation as "Acid"
 1969 The Good Guys and the Bad Guys as "Deuce"
 1970 Barquero as Fair
 1971 Adam-12 as Wally Barstow (Episode: A Child in Danger)
 1971 Drag Racer as Dave
 1971 Shoot Out as Skeeter 
 1971 Adam-12 as Robert "Robin" Saydo (Episode: The Radical)
 1971 The D.A. as Robert "Robin" Saydo (Episode: The People vs. Saydo)
 1972 Moon of the Wolf as Tom Gurmandy Jr.
 1973 Adam-12 as Steve Deal (Episode: Killing Ground)
 1973 Pat Garrett and Billy the Kid as Norris
 1974 Columbo as Eddie Kane (Episode: Publish or Perish)
 1974 The Take as Man With Braces
 1974 The Ultimate Thrill as Evans
 1975 Capone as Earl "Hymie" Weiss
 1975 Walking Tall Part 2 as Ray Henry
 1976 The Outlaw Josey Wales as First Bounty Hunter 
 1976 Mako: The Jaws of Death as Charlie 
 1976 Scorchy as Nicky 
 1976 Chesty Anderson, USN as Dr. Cheech
 1976 Doc Hooker's Bunch as Roy
 1977 Whiskey Mountain as Rudy 
 1977 The Shadow of Chikara as Rafe 
 1979 The Little Dragons as Carl
 1982 The Sword and the Sorcerer Guard #1
 1983 Triumphs of a Man Called Horse as Mason
 1986 Airwolf as Gentry 
 1987 Adventures in Babysitting as Bleak 
 1988 Double Revenge as Charlie "Big Charlie"
 1991 Trancers II as Wino #1
 1991 Only the Lonely as Duane Earl Tyrone
 1993 Body of Evidence as Dr. Novaro 
 1994 Phantasm III: Lord of the Dead as Henry
 1995 Carnosaur 2 as Zeb

References

External links
 
  and also here

1935 births
2010 deaths
People from Hinton, West Virginia
American male film actors
American male television actors
20th-century American male actors
Male actors from West Virginia